The Criminal Justice Act 1993 (c 36) is a United Kingdom Act of Parliament that set out new rules regarding drug trafficking, proceeds and profit of crime, financing of terrorism and insider dealing.

Overview
Section 52 creates an offence of insider dealing, or using private information to trade in shares or securities when the same information is not yet available to the public.

Case law
Patel v Mirza [2016] UKSC 42, on the illegality principle, and right to recover money paid even though it was to be used for insider dealing, contrary to section 52

See also
Criminal Justice Act - other acts with similar titles
English criminal law
UK company law

Notes

External links
Original text on OPSI
Hansard records

United Kingdom Acts of Parliament 1993
United Kingdom company law
English criminal law
Criminal law of the United Kingdom